777 is the second studio album by American rapper and singer Latto. It was released through RCA Records and Streamcut on March 25, 2022. The album features guest appearances from 21 Savage, Lil Wayne, Childish Gambino, Lil Durk, Nardo Wick, and Kodak Black. Production was handled by Sonny Digital, Dr. Luke, FnZ, JetsonMade, D.A. Got That Dope, and Pharrell Williams, among others. It serves as the follow-up to her debut album, Queen of da Souf (2020).

Background
In an interview with Complex, Latto said that she was experimenting with various sounds and genres on the album to showcase her versatility, including pop, R&B, trap, and rhythmic vibes. She said that she had started working on it right after her previous album, Queen of da Souf (2020), and recorded the first song from the album in that year. She also explained why she chose the title of the album: Seven is God's number, so it just started with that. From a younger age, seven has always been my favorite number. And then triple—it triumphs 666, or overcomes 666. It became a part of my brand when I changed my name to Latto in reference to the lottery and casino, hitting the jackpot is 777. But it already had a meaning to me. It just somehow aligned with my career.

About a week before the album was released, she sat down for an interview with The Breakfast Club, in which she claimed that a male artist who is featured on a song from the album tried to engage in sexual activity with her and make it hard for her to clear a sample on it. Fans assumed that it was Kodak Black, considering previous comments he had made related to the topic, but he later denied that it was him and Latto also denied that it was 21 Savage.

Release and promotion
Latto announced the album and its release date alongside its cover art on March 14, 2022. She revealed the tracklist one week later, on March 21, 2022.

Singles
The lead single of the album, "Big Energy", was released on September 24, 2021. The second single, "Soufside", was released on November 5, 2021. The third single, "Wheelie", which features Atlanta-based rapper 21 Savage, was released on March 11, 2022. "Sunshine", which features Lil Wayne and Childish Gambino, impacted US rhythmic contemporary radio on April 26, 2022, as the album's fourth single.

Music and lyrics 
AllMusic wrote that Latto covers "the standard range of topics" such as "bedroom bragging" on "Wheelie" and "getting money and demolishing enemies" on "Trust No Bitch". It also noted that most of the songs are trap while Latto tries out different genres on some songs. "Sunshine" blends trap drums with gospel vocals. "Like a Thug" is R&B while "Real One" and "Big Energy" are pop.

Critical reception

Writing for Clash, Ana Lamond felt that "the tracklist weaves through Big Latto, the signature hard-hitting persona, whilst turning to the more sensual, R&B production that lends itself to a vulnerability" and "there's a sense that the riser is leaning into an increasingly diverse approach, welcoming a pop-centric commercial appeal", adding that "777 is daring and ambitious, paving the way for Latto's fortunes as she embraces the spheres outside of Atlanta rap" and "at the end of the day, she's got it tatted on her wrist...". Jordan Bassett of NME opined that "away from the Billboard-bothering singles, Alyssa Stephens [referring to Latto by her real name] dials down the braggadocio and dials up the introspection, though the overall mood is buoyant" and "it's a record that meets Stephens on the other side of criticism that has dogged her since she introduced her unintentionally offensive former moniker, Mulatto, as an eventual winner of reality show The Rap Game in 2016".

Pitchfork music critic Tyra Nicole Triche stated that "777 proves that Latto is a formidable force, though there's still work to do to realize her full potential" and "if she hasn't quite nailed down a winning sound, she's willing to take some big gambles". Tom Breihan of Stereogum wrote that 777 is "a sharp and canny piece of pop-rap". He noted that the album is "total major-label product" with all of the tracks sounding like "potential singles" because Latto is trying to make hits. He concluded that it is "pretty entertaining, in its low-stakes, low-commitment kind of way".

Mid-year lists

Year-end lists

Track listing

Notes
 "Big Energy" contains a sample of Tom Tom Club's 1981 song "Genius of Love". Its official remix additionally interpolates Mariah Carey's 1995 song "Fantasy".
 "Bussdown" interpolates "A Thousand Miles", written and performed by Vanessa Carlton.
 "Sleep Sleep" contains a sample of "Get It Wet", performed by Twista and produced by The Legendary Traxster.

Personnel

 Sonny Digital – production (1)
 Diego Ave – production (2)
 Bankroll Got It – production (2)
 Sage Skolfield – production (3, 11)
 Sean Solymar – production (3, 11)
 Hollywood Cole – production (3)
 Dr. Luke – production (4)
 Vaughn Oliver – production (4)
 BongoByTheWay – production (5)
 Luke Crowder – production (5)
 Dis – production (6)
 Beat Butcha – production (6)
 Coop the Truth – production (6)
 Pooh Beatz – production (7, 8)
 FnZ – production (7)
 JetsonMade – production (7)
 D.A. Got That Dope – production (9)
 OG Parker – production (10)
 Romano – production (10)
 TenRoc – production (10)
 June James – production (11)
 BoogzDaBeast – production (12)
 Pharrell Williams – production (13)

Charts

Weekly charts

Year-end charts

References

2022 albums
Latto albums
Albums produced by Beat Butcha
Albums produced by D. A. Doman
Albums produced by Dr. Luke
Albums produced by FnZ
Albums produced by JetsonMade
Albums produced by Pharrell Williams
Albums produced by Sonny Digital